Mattie Thomas (born 5 December 1991) is a New Zealand cricketer. He played in one List A match for Central Districts in 2015.

See also
 List of Central Districts representative cricketers

References

External links
 

1991 births
Living people
New Zealand cricketers
Central Districts cricketers
Cricketers from Hāwera